Charles Lomba "China" Valles (November 5, 1925 – December 17, 2014) was an American jazz radio broadcaster.

Jazz authority and broadcaster
He was a noted jazz authority and prominent jazz personality in South Florida for several decades. Over the years, his programs aired on several Miami radio stations, including WFAB, WMBM, WGBS, WBUS, WTMI, and WDNA.

Duke Ellington
Valles was also known by the sobriquet "The Maharajah, Purveyor of Swirls", a nickname given to him by his friend, Duke Ellington,

Death
Valles died on December 17, 2014, in Miami, at the age of 89.

References

1925 births
2014 deaths
American radio personalities
Radio personalities from Florida
Radio personalities from Miami
African-American radio personalities
Jazz radio presenters
20th-century African-American people
21st-century African-American people